Kastamonu Castle is a medieval castle in Kastamonu, Turkey.

Geography
The castle lies inside the urban fabric of the modern city.

History
During the 10th century, the area around Kastamonu was under the rule of the Byzantine commander Manuel Erotikos Komnenos who built the castle bearing his name: Kastra Komnenon, "Castle of the Komnenoi", a corrupted version of which later became the name of the city in Turkish, i.e. Kastamonu. The city and the castle was captured by the Çobanoğlu on behalf of the Seljuks of Rum. After the Çobanoğlu, the castle fell to the Candarid beylik and finally to the Ottoman Empire. During the Turkish Republic era, in 1943, a part of the castle was destroyed as a result of 1943 Tosya–Ladik earthquake. In 2005 Kastamonu municipality partially restored the castle.

Building
The original castle had fortification walls around the city. But presently only the inner castle which was restored during the Candarid era is partially standing. There are 15 bastions and a secret  passage to the outer castle.

References

History of Kastamonu
Byzantine fortifications in Turkey
Byzantine Anatolia
Buildings and structures in Kastamonu Province
Ruined castles in Turkey
Former buildings and structures in Turkey
10th-century establishments in the Byzantine Empire